Harringay Green Lanes railway station is on the Gospel Oak to Barking line in Harringay, north London.

Services
All passenger services from the station are operated by London Overground. The lines through the station are also used frequently by freight trains. Electrification work on the route (including bridge rebuilding, track lowering and platform lengthening) saw the service suspended on weekends for a year from June 2016, whilst weekday services terminated at  until 23 September; thereafter there were no trains at all until February 2017 (when weekday services resumed).

Connections
London Buses routes 29, 141, 341 and night route N29 serve the station.

The station is a 0.36 mile (0.58 km) walk from Harringay railway station on the East Coast Main Line.

History
It was opened on 1 June 1880 with the name Green Lanes, but has since been renamed a number of times:
Harringay Park, Green Lanes (1883)
Harringay Park (18 June 1951)
Harringay Stadium (27 October 1958)
Harringay East (12 May 1990)
Harringay Green Lanes (8 July 1991)

There were originally wooden platform buildings, which were replaced by brick and concrete structures in the 1950s. The original ticket office at street level survived and in recent times has been converted into a café. To cope with the huge number of passengers visiting Harringay Stadium and Arena, both right next to the station, very long platforms were provided, but these were shortened in late 2003 due to subsidence. Just west of the station was a goods yard; this closed on 3 February 1964, and the site is now occupied by Railway Fields nature reserve.

Station infrastructure
In summer 2008, the station was repainted and re-signed in London Overground colours, with the green-painted staircase railings (for example) of the former Silverlink franchise giving way to Overground orange.

Transfer on a single ticket is allowed between Harringay Green Lanes and nearby .

The station has step-free access from street to platform.

References

Bibliography

External links

 Barking & Gospel Oak Line Users Group Website
 Harringay Online – Local Community Website for area around Harringay, Green Lanes Station
 Pictures of the station and its environs on the Harringay Flickr group
 Harringay Online's Harringay Timeline
 Article on Transition Finsbury Park Website telling the story of planting fruit trees on unused land around the station entrances.

Railway stations in the London Borough of Haringey
DfT Category E stations
Former Tottenham and Hampstead Junction Railway stations
Railway stations in Great Britain opened in 1880
Railway stations served by London Overground
Harringay